Zavrh is a settlement north of Dole in the Municipality of Litija in central Slovenia. The area is part of the traditional region of Lower Carniola and is now included with the rest of the municipality in the Central Sava Statistical Region.

References

External links
Zavrh on Geopedia

Populated places in the Municipality of Litija